Goryeosan is a mountain in Incheon, South Korea.

See also
 List of mountains in Korea

Notes

References
 

Mountains of South Korea